Presidential elections were held for the first time in São Tomé and Príncipe on 3 March 1991, as previously the President had been elected by the National Assembly. Ultimately only one candidate, Miguel Trovoada, ran for office, and was elected unopposed. He was sworn in as the second president of São Tomé and Príncipe on 3 April.

Candidates
Three candidates stated their intention to participate in the contest; Miguel Trovoada, a former Prime Minister running as an independent (with the support of both the PCD-GR and CODO), Monso dos Santos of the Christian Democratic Front (FDC) and Guadalupe de Ceita, an independent candidate. Manuel Pinto da Costa, President since independence in 1975, declared that he would not be contesting the election and that he would retire from politics. The MLSTP-PSD did not present an alternative candidate. 

In February, less than a month before the election, both Monso dos Santos and Guadalupe de Ceita withdrew from the election leaving Trovoada as the sole candidate.

Results

References

Presidential elections in São Tomé and Príncipe
Sao Tome
1991 in São Tomé and Príncipe
March 1991 events in Africa